Desmond Douglas MBE (born 20 July 1955 in Jamaica) is a British table tennis player. He lived and was brought up in the area of Handsworth, Birmingham, West Midlands.  He was an attacking, left-handed, player, notable for his scissor jump smash. He was famous for his use of close to the table blocks on the backhand side, mixing pace with powerful topspin from his forehand side.

Douglas was 11 times English Table Tennis champion, who peaked at equal World No. 7 and European No. 3. He represented Great Britain at the 1988 Seoul Olympics, in both the singles and the doubles, where he was partnered by Sky Andrew. Douglas played professionally in The West German Bundesliga for eight years , between 1977-1985.

Douglas is still actively involved in table tennis, coaching throughout the country, including training some of the top young British prospects at the Youth Development Squad. He also coaches at Sutton Coldfield College and Woodfield Table Tennis Club, Wolverhampton.

Douglas was appointed Member of the Order of the British Empire (MBE) in the 1987 Birthday Honours, for services to table tennis. He lives in Walsall, West Midlands.

See also
 List of England players at the World Team Table Tennis Championships
 List of table tennis players

References

English male table tennis players
Living people
1955 births
English people of Jamaican descent
Jamaican emigrants to the United Kingdom
Members of the Order of the British Empire
Olympic table tennis players of Great Britain
Table tennis players at the 1988 Summer Olympics
Black British sportsmen
Sportspeople from Walsall
Sportspeople from Handsworth, West Midlands